Christopher O. Barnes (born September 23, 1986) is an American chemist who is an assistant professor at Stanford University. During the COVID-19 pandemic, he studied the structure of the coronavirus spike protein and the antibodies that attack them. He was named one of ten "Scientists to watch" by Science News in 2022.

Early life and education 
Barnes grew up in Huntersville, North Carolina. He attended North Mecklenburg High School. As a teenager, he competed in the science olympiad. He was an undergraduate at the University of North Carolina at Chapel Hill, where he was involved with the American football team. During his senior year, he was named the top student athlete. Although he had initially applied to study medicine, he changed his mind after being introduced to biophysics by Gary Pielak. He was a bachelor's student in psychology, and moved to chemistry for his graduate studies. In 2010 he moved to the University of Pittsburgh, where he started researching molecular pharmacology. He looked into eukaryotic transcription using crystallographic techniques and electron microscopy. After earning his doctorate, Barnes started investigating the structure of HIV and the antibodies that attack it. He looked to understand how the virus contacts/enters cells to better inform the design of therapeutics.

Research and career 
Barnes was a postdoctoral researcher at California Institute of Technology when the COVID-19 pandemic started. He was working alongside Pamela J. Bjorkman, who challenged him to uncover the structure of immune proteins that would attack SARS-CoV-2. Barnes used high-resolution imaging to better understand coronavirus spike proteins and the antibodies that attack them. He used cryo-electron microscopy, and identified several antibodies that attach to the receptor binding domain on the coronavirus spike protein. He defined an antibody classification system to determine where on the receptor binding domain that the antibody attaches.

Barnes continued to work on antibody structure when he established his own laboratory at Stanford University. These antibodies target the N-terminal domain. He is interested in identifying antibodies that can attack all coronaviruses.

In September 2022 Science News named Barnes one of ten "Scientists to watch".

Awards and honors 
 2017 Howard Hughes Medical Institute Hanna H. Gray Fellow
 2022 Rita Allen Foundation Scholar

Selected publications

Personal life 
Barnes has two sons.

References 

1986 births
Living people
People from Huntersville, North Carolina
University of North Carolina at Chapel Hill alumni
Stanford University Department of Chemistry faculty
American chemists
21st-century American chemists